Charles "Doc" Gamble is an American football coach. He was most recently the head football coach at the University of Arkansas at Pine Bluff, a position he held from 2020 through October of 2022.

Coaching career

High school 
Gamble had a successful run as a high school coach at both Withrow High School in Cincinnati and Fairfield High School in Fairfield, Ohio. He compiled a 53–19 record, sent 120 of his players onto college football and in 2004 won the Paul Brown Excellence in Coaching Award.

Early college jobs
Gamble started his coaching career at his alma mater, Tennessee Martin. Gamble was an assistant coach at Mount St. Joseph University. Spent time as a graduate assistant while helping with linebackers at East Carolina. Gamble also was an offensive assistant at Cincinnati. Gamble wore many hats at Alcorn State where he coached running backs and tight ends and was the recruiting coordinator.

Kent State
Gamble coached the wide receivers at Kent State University for five seasons. He coached Dri Archer and several other all-conference wide receivers at Kent State.

Arkansas–Pine Bluff
Gamble spent two seasons as associate head coach and quarterbacks coach at the University of Arkansas at Pine Bluff. In 2019, Arkansas–Pine Bluff finished second in the Southwestern Athletic Conference (SWAC) in passing yards. After head coach Cedric Thomas left for Southern Miss, Gamble was promoted to interim head coach. On April 23, 2020 Gamble was named the 21st head football coach in Arkansas–Pine Bluff history. Gamble was relieved of his duties midway through to 2022 season, after a 4-14 stretch.

Head coaching record

College

References

External links
 Arkansas–Pine Bluff profile
 Kent State profile

Year of birth missing (living people)
Living people
American football quarterbacks
Alcorn State Braves football coaches
Arkansas–Pine Bluff Golden Lions football coaches
Cincinnati Bearcats football coaches
East Carolina Pirates football coaches
Kent State Golden Flashes football coaches
UT Martin Skyhawks football coaches
High school football coaches in Ohio
North Dakota State College of Science alumni
African-American coaches of American football
21st-century African-American people